The Ministry of State Property of the Republic of Croatia was the ministry in the government of Croatia responsible for state property management.

List of ministers

Ministers of Privatisation and Property Management (1995–1999)

References

External links
Official website 

Tourism
Croatia